Beckfoot Upper Heaton (formerly Belle Vue Boys' School) is a co-educational secondary school in Bradford, West Yorkshire, England. It is situated near the Hallmark Cards factory, not far from Bingley Road (B6269).

Previously a boys' school, Beckfoot Upper Heaton introduced girls starting in Year 7 in September 2016 and moved to new buildings in 2017.

History
The school was founded in 1877 and was officially opened (including the girls' section) on 12 August 1879 by William Edward Forster, the local MP. It moved to the present site in 1964, as a boys secondary grammar school. It was known as Belle Vue High School from 1896. In 1918, the junior and infants section closed, with the buildings being taken over. From 1966 it became a comprehensive. It had four houses – Dunwell, Hirst, Holroyd and Parry.

Previously a community school administered by Bradford City Council, Belle Vue Boys' School converted to academy status in September 2015 and was renamed Beckfoot Upper Heaton. The school is now sponsored by the Beckfoot Trust, but continues to coordinate with Bradford City Council for admissions.

Notable former pupils

Belle Vue Boys' School
 Adil Rashid – Yorkshire and England cricket player
 Marsha Singh 1954– 2012 – Labour MP for Bradford West (includes the school) 1997 to 2012

Belle Vue Boys' Grammar School

 Paul Bayes, Bishop of Liverpool 
 Mike Batt, Composer and music producer
 David Straun (Smith), Actor
 Kamlesh Patel, Baron Patel of Bradford, OBE – politician and member of the House of Lords.
 Sir Reginald Bailey CBE – former President of the British Wool Federation
 Sir James Birrell FCA – Chief Executive from 1988–93 of the Halifax Building Society 
 Sydney Burton – Managing Director from 1975–81 of the Gateway Building Society (bought by The Woolwich in 1988) and President from 1976–77 of the Building Societies Institute (became the CBSI in 1979 and then became part of the Chartered Institute of Bankers) 
 David Butterfield, Archdeacon of the East Riding from 2007–14
 Malcolm Creek LVO OBE – High Commissioner from 1985–88 to Vanuatu (High Commission abolished in 2004) 
 Trevor Croft – Director from 1997–2001 of the National Trust for Scotland 
 Satnam Singh Gill OBE Principal Working Men's College London from 1999  
 James Hill (British director), film director of 1966 Born Free
 Philip Hobsbaum, poet and literary scholar
 Kenneth Hutton, Chairman from 1987-92 of the Peterborough Development Agency, Chief Engineer from 1968-84 of the Telford Development Corporation
 Norman Crowther Hunt, Baron Crowther-Hunt of Eccleshill – former Labour education minister from 1974–76, Rector from 1982-87 of Exeter College, Oxford
 Sir Robert Yewdall Jennings – President from 1991–94 of the International Court of Justice
 George Layton, actor – starred in Confessions of a Driving Instructor
 Harry Moore – Professor of Glass Technology from 1946–55 at the University of Sheffield
 Geoffrey Myers CBE – British Rail executive and Chairman from 1987–95 of Transaid 
 Prof John Needham – Professor of Architecture from 1957–72 at the University of Sheffield
 Maurice Peston, Baron Peston (briefly), economist at Queen Mary College, and father of Robert Peston
 J. B. Priestley OM, writer, who wrote Time and the Conways, and Freeman of the City of Bradford
 Simon Rouse – well-known actor who played Jack Meadows in The Bill
 Jack Schofield – former computer editor, The Guardian
 Sydney Smith CBE – Chairman from 1956–65 of the Scottish Gas Board and from 1952–56 of the East Midlands Gas Board 
 Prof Fred Watson AM – astronomer
 Fielding West – Labour MP from 1934–35 for Hammersmith North and from 1929–31 Kensington North

See also 
 Belle Vue Girls' Academy

References

External links
 Beckfoot Upper Heaton official website

News items
 Former school site to open as a Muslim school in May 2004

Schools in Bradford
Educational institutions established in 1877
1877 establishments in England
Secondary schools in the City of Bradford
Academies in the City of Bradford
People educated at Belle Vue Boys' Grammar School, Bradford